Vitali Mikhailovich Pinyaskin (born 24 August 1972 in Moscow) is a former Russian football player.

Honours
Dinaburg
Latvian Higher League bronze: 1996, 1997
Latvian Football Cup runner-up: 1997

References

1972 births
Footballers from Moscow
Living people
Soviet footballers
FC Dynamo Moscow reserves players
FC Lokomotiv Moscow players
Russian footballers
FC Chernomorets Novorossiysk players
Russian Premier League players
Dinaburg FC players
Russian expatriate footballers
Expatriate footballers in Latvia
PFC Spartak Nalchik players
FC Zhemchuzhina Sochi players
FC Khimki players
CS Tiligul-Tiras Tiraspol players
Expatriate footballers in Moldova
Association football midfielders